Stewart Raffill is a British writer and director.

Biography
 
Raffill was born in England and grew up near Stratford before immigrating to the US and working in the motion picture industry. His writing and directing work in film and TV spans several genres including science fiction, family, comedy and drama.

Film
Raffill made his feature debut as director with The Tender Warrior, starring Dan Haggerty and sold to Warner Brothers. It was filmed on location in Okefenokee Swamp in Georgia.

He sold his next script, Napoleon and Samantha, to Disney. Raffill also worked on the film as a producer. The film starred Jodie Foster and Michael Douglas.

He wrote and directed When the North Wind Blows.

Raffill wrote and directed The Adventures of the Wilderness Family  with Robert Logan, leading to two sequels.

He followed it with two films with Logan, Across the Great Divide and The Sea Gypsies.

Raffill wrote and directed High Risk, shot in Mexico, starring James Brolin which he later described as a personal favorite. The film got him the job of writing and directing The Ice Pirates, made for John Forman and David Begelman at MGM.

Raffill directed and did uncredited writing on The Philadelphia Experiment that won Best Science Fiction Film at the Rome Film Festival.

Raffill directed and wrote Mac and Me, made to provide royalties to the McDonald's Foundation and starred Jade Calegory, who had spina bifida. The film is frequently cited as one of the worst ever made, but it later attained cult status and was re-released in 2019.

Begelmen hired Raffill to direct Mannequin Two: On the Move. Raffill wrote the original screenplay for Passenger 57.

Raffill wrote and directed Lost in Africa made for the Tusk charity. He also wrote and directed Tammy and the T-Rex, which was re-released in 2019 and was the official selection for the Fantastic Fest and premiered at Beyond Fest. It starred Paul Walker, Denise Richards and Terry Kiser.

Other credits include A Month of Sundays, starring Rod Steiger, Sal Sapienza and Dee Wallace Stone; Survival Island, starring Billy Zane and Juan Pablo DiPace; Mysterious; and the family musical Standing Ovation.

Television
He moved into directing for TV with The New Adventures of Robin Hood and the TV movie The New Swiss Family Robinson with Jane Seymour and David Carradine, which he also wrote. He directed Grizzly Falls that won the Heartland Award and starred Bryan Brown.

Raffill directed episodes of Pensacola: Wings of Gold and 18 Wheels of Justice, and the TV movie Croc (2007).

Filmography

TV credits

References

External links

Personal website

1942 births
Living people
British film directors
British male screenwriters
Science fiction film directors